The 2015 season was Sogndal's first season back in the OBOS-ligaen following their relegation at the end of the 2014 season. They finished the season as Champions, whilst also reaching the Third Round of the Norwegian Cup where they were defeated by Hønefoss.

Squad

Transfers

Winter

In:

Out:

Summer

In:

Out:

Competitions

OBOS-ligaen

Results summary

Results by round

Results

Table

Norwegian Cup

Squad statistics

Appearances and goals

|-
|colspan="14"|Players away from Sogndal on loan:
|-
|colspan="14"|Players who left Sogndal during the season:

|}

Goal scorers

Disciplinary record

References

Sogndal Fotball seasons
Sogndal